Mount Zuqualla (also spelled Zuquala, Zikwala or Chuqqaala) is an extinct volcano in the Oromia Region of Ethiopia.

History 

Both the mountain and the lake is a holy site to the Oromo living nearby. The ambivalent attitude regarding the holiness of the mountain is seen in the Oromo proverb: "Those who live far away worship it, those who live nearby plow it."

The lake in the crater has an island Tulluu Irreechaa, said to have been founded by Abba Gadaa of Tuulama on the site of a hermitage used by Saint Mercurius. This monastery was destroyed, and a church at the foot of the mountain looted, by Imam Ahmad Gragn in 1531; two churches were later built at the monastery, one dedicated to St Gebre Menfas built by Menelik II in 1880 and designed by the Italian Sebastian Castagna, and the other dedicated to Kidane Mihret built during the reign of Haile Selassie. Various other holy sites are found around the mountain, mostly rock formations, while the monastery is the site of a biannual festival.

The explorers Orazio Antinori, Antonelli and Antonio Cecchi used Zuqualla to determine various geographical locations in May 1881. Dr Scott, on behalf of Cambridge University and the British Museum, secured a large and valuable entomological collection near Zuqualla in 1926. Three of the leaders of the attempted 1960 Ethiopian coup fled to Zuqualla from the capital, where the Moja family had land. Two of them lost their lives 24 December while Mengistu Neway, seriously wounded, was captured and brought to the capital for trial.

See also 
 List of volcanoes in Ethiopia

Notes

External links 
 
 Aerial photo of Mount Zuquala and its crater lake

Volcanic crater lakes
Extinct volcanoes
Mountains of Ethiopia
Oromia Region
Sacred mountains
Stratovolcanoes of Ethiopia
Pleistocene stratovolcanoes
Zuqualla